Bomber is a 2009 British comedy-drama film directed and written by Paul Cotter and starring Shane Taylor, Benjamin Whitrow, and Eileen Nicholas. The plot is about an 83-year-old man returning to Germany for a long planned journey of atonement.

It is also Benjamin Whitrow's final film before his death in 2017.

Plot
Shane Taylor, Benjamin Whitrow, and Eileen Nicholas star in Paul Cotter's bittersweet comedy about an old man who goes back to Germany to apologise to a village he accidentally bombed during the war.

Lovelorn art school graduate Ross is still down in the dumps when his eighty-three-year-old father announces plans for a family road trip to Germany. Back in the war, Ross's father accidentally bombed a small German town and he's regretted the mistake ever since. He's determined to make amends but getting to Germany won't be easy, because it's been years since father and son have exchanged a kind word. Along the way, father and son both learn some important lessons that will help them to be better, more compassionate people in the future.

Awards and reception
Bomber premiered at the 2009 SXSW (South by Southwest) Film Festival in the Narrative Competition. The film subsequently appeared at film festivals across the world including Filmfest München, Torino, Raindance, Mill Valley and Gothenburg. Along the way, Bomber picked up the following awards:

 Winner, Best Director, Savannah Film Festival 
 Winner, Best Feature, Sonoma International Film Festival
 Winner, Best Feature, San Luis Obispo Film Festival
 Winner, Best Feature and Audience Award, Estes Park Film Festival
 Winner, Best Feature, 540 Film Festival
 Winner, Best UK Feature, Falstaff International Film Festival
 Winner, Best Actress, BendFilm
 Winner, Best Actress, Nashville Film Festival
 Winner, Best Actress, Kyiv International Film Festival
 Honoree, New Director's Grand Jury Prize, Nashville Film Festival
 Runner-up, Best Feature, Anchorage International Film Festival
 Nominee, Best Micro-Budget Feature, Raindance

References

External links
 
 

2009 films
2009 comedy-drama films
British comedy-drama films
2000s English-language films
2000s British films